The Generous was a Japanese musical duo consisting of Yoko Yazawa on vocals and Katsumi Ohnishi on guitar. The song "Dream Star" from their mini-album released October 29, 2008 is featured as the first opening theme for the anime Skip Beat!.

Discography

Albums
the generous - October 29, 2008
Melody
Dream Star
旅人
Rainbow
Open your eyes
Melody(English ver.)
Dream Star(English ver.)

Singles
"Heart" - March 11, 2009
Heart
未来への扉
Renaissance

References

External links
 Official Website
 The Generous on Avex Group

Japanese pop music groups
Avex Group artists
Japanese musical duos
Musical groups from Tokyo